Clarence Williams III (born August 7, 1969) is a former professional American football tight end and running back who played in the National Football League for the Cleveland Browns.

His father was defensive back Clarence "Clancy" Williams (1942–1986), an All-American at Washington State University who played eight seasons in the NFL with the Los Angeles Rams from 1965 through 1972.

Like his father, Clarence III played high school football at Renton and college football at Washington State in Pullman. He was selected in the seventh round (169th overall) of the 1993 NFL Draft by the Denver Broncos.

Williams also played for the Frankfurt Galaxy in the World League of American Football. In 2013, he was voted the greatest tight end in Washington State University history by the editors of Cougfan.com. Williams concluded his WSU career with the tight ends record for catches (95) and yards (1,263). He was named first-team all-Pac-10 three straight seasons, 1990–92.

References

External links

1969 births
Living people
Players of American football from Los Angeles
Players of American football from Seattle
American football running backs
American football tight ends
Washington State Cougars football players
Cleveland Browns players
Frankfurt Galaxy players
Sportspeople from Renton, Washington